Springfield is a famously common place-name in the English-speaking world, especially in the United States. According to the U.S. Geological Survey there are currently 34 populated places named Springfield in 25 U.S. states, including five in Wisconsin; additionally, there are at least 36 Springfield Townships, including 11 in Ohio. Database studies reveal that there are several more common U.S. place-names than Springfield, including Fairview and Midway. The name "Springfield" is common in Britain and Ireland: two examples being on the outskirts of Shrewsbury, Shropshire, and one located within the borough of Wigan, close to the town centre.

History
Historically, the first American place named Springfield was Springfield, Massachusetts, founded in 1636 by William Pynchon. An early American colonist, Pynchon named Springfield after his hometown in England, Springfield, Essex. Springfield, Massachusetts, became nationally important in 1777, when George Washington founded the United States' National Armory at Springfield. During the 19th century, Springfield became one of the world's leading centers of the Industrial Revolution, pioneering advances in interchangeable parts. Springfield, Illinois and Springfield, Missouri, among other American cities and towns named Springfield, were named after Springfield, Massachusetts.

Major centers
As of the 2010 census, Springfield, Missouri and Springfield, Massachusetts were the world's most populous cities named Springfield, with 159,630 and 155,575 residents, respectively. Springfield, Illinois, the one-time home of Abraham Lincoln, is the only U.S. state capital with the name.  As of 2006, it had an estimated population of 116,482.

In the United States, there are four Springfield Metropolitan Statistical Areas - in Illinois, Massachusetts, Missouri and Ohio; as of the 2016 census, the most populous was the one in Missouri, which had 541,991 residents.

In contemporary culture
The television show The Simpsons is set in a town generically named "Springfield", without indicating a state. Creator Matt Groening has suggested in interviews that he chose the name because of its ubiquity; the show's intentionally contradictory information about the location of the town prevents matching the fictional Springfield to a real one. Groening revealed in 2012 the town referred to Springfield, Oregon, which is close to his hometown of Portland.

A "Springfield" was also the setting of the early 1950s radio and television program, Father Knows Best, as well as the 1950s soap opera The Guiding Light, which continued as the CBS soap opera Guiding Light through 2009.  "Springfield" was also the given locale for the 1957-1963 television series Leave it to Beaver.

See also
Springfield (disambiguation)

References

External links
Website with a list of many Springfields, illustrated by postcards.

1636 establishments in Massachusetts
1636 introductions
City names